Robert Carl "Bud" McFarlane (July 12, 1937 – May 12, 2022) was an American Marine Corps officer who served as National Security Advisor to President Ronald Reagan from 1983 to 1985. Within the Reagan administration, McFarlane was a leading architect of the Strategic Defense Initiative, a project intended to defend the US from Soviet ballistic missile attacks. He resigned as National Security Adviser in late 1985 because of disagreements with other administration figures but remained involved in negotiations with Iran and with Hezbollah.

McFarlane was a central figure in the Iran–Contra affair, an operation in which the Reagan administration funneled weapons to Iran and diverted the profits to illegally fund right-wing rebels in Nicaragua. When the scheme came to light, administration officials implemented a plan to insulate Reagan and senior officials by focusing blame on McFarlane. He ultimately pleaded guilty to four misdemeanor counts and admitted that he had hidden information about the Reagan administration's support of the Contras from Congress. Suffering from guilt over his role in the scheme and feeling betrayed by Reagan, who, McFarlane later wrote, "approved every single action I ever took" but "lacked the moral conviction and intellectual courage to stand up in our defense and in defense of his policy." McFarlane attempted suicide in 1987. He was later pardoned, along with several other figures in the Iran-Contra scandal, by President George H. W. Bush shortly before he left office. 

After his pardon, McFarlane operated a consulting business. He was investigated by the FBI in 2009 over concerns that he was illegally lobbying on behalf of the Sudanese government of Omar al-Bashir but was not charged with any crime. McFarlane died in Lansing, Michigan on May 12, 2022 from a lung condition.

Early life and education
McFarlane was the son of Texas Democratic Congressman William McFarlane. After graduating high school, McFarlane entered the United States Naval Academy at Annapolis in 1955, where he graduated in 1959. He was the third member of his family to attend the Academy, after his uncle Robert McFarlane (1925) and his brother Bill (1949). At the academy he graduated in the top 15 percent of the class and lettered twice in gymnastics. He received an honorary doctorate from the Institute of World Politics in Washington, D.C., in 2014. He sang in the Chapel Choir, and was a Brigade Administrative Officer and 14th Company Commander. He married his high school sweetheart, Jonda Riley.

Marine Corps service

Following graduation from the Naval Academy in 1959, McFarlane was commissioned a second lieutenant in the Marine Corps, where he served as a field artillery officer.

As a Marine Corps officer, McFarlane commanded platoons, a battery of field artillery howitzers and was the Operations Officer for an artillery regiment. He taught Gunnery at the Army Advanced Artillery Course. He was the executive assistant to the Marine Corps' Operations Deputy from 1968–1971, preparing the deputy for meetings with the Joint Chiefs of Staff. During this assignment he was also the Action Officer in the Marine Corps Operations Division for Europe/NATO, the Middle East, and Latin America.

McFarlane served two combat tours in the Vietnam War. In March 1965, he commanded an artillery battery in the first landing of U.S. combat forces in Vietnam. While deployed during his first tour, McFarlane was selected for graduate studies as an Olmsted Scholar. McFarlane received a master's degree (License) in strategic studies with highest honors from the Graduate Institute of International Studies (Institut de Hautes Etudes Internationales, HEI) in Geneva, Switzerland.

After attending the Graduate Institute of International Studies, McFarlane returned to Vietnam for a second tour in 1967–1968 as a Regimental Fire Support Coordinator for the 3rd Marine Division deployed along the Vietnamese Demilitarized Zone during the Tet Offensive. He organized all fire support (B-52s, naval gunfire from the USS New Jersey (BB-62), and artillery) for forces deployed at Con Thien, Cam Lo, Dong Ha, The Rockpile, Khe Sanh, and points between. McFarlane received a Bronze Star and a Navy Commendation Medal, both with Valor device.

Following his second tour in Vietnam and a tour at Headquarters Marine Corps, in 1971 he was named a White House Fellow. He was the first Marine Corps officer selected for the program.

McFarlane was assigned to the White House Office of Legislative Affairs and at the conclusion of that assignment was selected as the Military Assistant to Henry Kissinger at the National Security Council. In this post, McFarlane dealt with intelligence exchanges with the People's Republic of China from 1973 to 1976, giving detailed intelligence briefings to the PRC at the time of the Sino-Soviet split. He also accompanied Kissinger on his visits to the PRC. In addition, McFarlane dealt with other aspects of foreign policy, including the Middle East, relations with the Soviet Union, and arms control. McFarlane was appointed by President Gerald Ford as his Special Assistant for National Security Affairs while a Lieutenant Colonel and was awarded the Navy Distinguished Service Medal in 1976.

Upon leaving the White House, McFarlane was assigned to the National Defense University, where he co-authored a book on crisis management while concurrently receiving a diploma from the National War College.

He ended his Marine Corps career on Okinawa as Operations Officer for the 12th Marine Regiment. McFarlane retired in 1979 as a lieutenant colonel.

Civilian posts
In 1979, McFarlane was appointed by U.S. Senator John Tower to the staff of the Senate Armed Services Committee, where he was responsible for staffing Senate consideration of the SALT II Treaty from 1979 to 1981. He also authored much of Ronald Reagan's foreign policy platform during the 1980 presidential campaign.

In 1981, President Reagan appointed and the Senate confirmed McFarlane as Counselor at the Department of State. In this post he assisted Secretary of State Alexander Haig.

In 1982, Reagan appointed McFarlane as Deputy National Security Advisor responsible for the integration of the policy recommendations of the Departments of State, Treasury, and Defense. In 1983, he was appointed by the president as his Special Representative in the Middle East responsible for Israeli-Arab negotiations.

McFarlane was criticized for having involved the United States armed forces in the Lebanon Civil War with gunship bombardment of Lebanese opposition forces which may have led to the 1983 Beirut barracks bombing where 241 American servicemen were killed.

Following that assignment, he returned to the White House and was appointed President Reagan's National Security Advisor. In that post, he was responsible for the development of U.S
foreign and defense policy. He was a supporter of the Strategic Defense Initiative (SDI or "Star Wars").

Iran-Contra affair and resignation

The Iran-Contra affair involved secretly selling arms to Iran and funneling the money to support the Contras in Nicaragua. As National Security Adviser, McFarlane urged Reagan to negotiate the arms deal with Iranian intermediaries, but McFarlane said that by late December 1985 he was urging Reagan to end the arms shipments. McFarlane resigned on December 4, 1985, citing that he wanted to spend more time with his family; he was replaced by Admiral John Poindexter.

The Iran-Contra affair came to light in November 1986 and a political scandal ensued. Disheartened, feeling abused by his former colleagues, and in depression over the embarrassment for the president that his actions had contributed to, McFarlane attempted suicide with an overdose of 25 to 30 valium tablets and was admitted into the hospital just two hours before his scheduled testimony before the Blue Ribbon panel appointed by President Reagan to investigate Iran-Contra known as the Tower Commission on February 9, 1987, saying he had failed his country.

In 1988, he pleaded guilty to four misdemeanor counts of withholding information from Congress as part of the Iran-Contra cover-up.  He was sentenced to two years' probation and a $20,000 fine but was pardoned by President George H. W. Bush on Christmas Eve 1992.

Other activities

McFarlane co-founded and served as CEO of McFarlane Associates Inc., an international consulting company.

He was also a Co-founder and Director of IP3 International (short for "International Peace Power & Prosperity"), a consortium of firms wanting to build nuclear reactors in Saudi Arabia that is led by retired U.S. military commanders and former White House officials.  Michael Flynn has described himself as an adviser to IP3, which the company denies.  In May 2019, McFarlane wrote an op-ed in The Washington Times advocating for developing nuclear power generation in the Middle East titled "The New Imperialism". This proposal, dubbed "Middle East Marshall Plan" by its backers, was detailed in a March 2017 White Paper written by Tom Barrack, the chairman of Donald Trump's Presidential Inaugural Committee, a senior adviser to Trump's presidential campaign, and a long-time close friend of and fundraiser for Donald Trump. In 2021, McFarlane co-wrote with David Gattie a piece for The National Interest, titled, "China and the Importance of Civil Nuclear Energy," which extended his ideas on nuclear energy to the geopolitical outlook for China.

McFarlane was a member of the Washington Institute for Near East Policy (WINEP) Board of Advisors, was president of the Institute for the Analysis of Global Security, was on the Board of Advisors, and was a founding member of the Set America Free Coalition. He was also an Advisory Board member for the Partnership for a Secure America, a not-for-profit organization dedicated to recreating the bipartisan center in American national security and foreign policy.

McFarlane served on a number of boards including:
 Aegis Defence Services – Non-executive director
 Partnership for a Secure America – Advisory Board
 Fuel Freedom Foundation – Advisory Board
 Myriant Incorporated – Advisory Board
 Member of the Committee on the Present Danger
 Alphabet Energy – advisory board

He was an advisor to John McCain's 2008 presidential campaign.
From 2009 on, McFarlane worked in the southern region of Sudan and Darfur on intertribal relations and development projects.  On September 30, 2009, the Washington Post published a story suggesting that McFarlane's contract for this work, which was supported by the government of Qatar, was the result of a request by Sudanese officials.  McFarlane denied any improper contact with Sudanese officials or efforts to avoid disclosure of his work.  The Washington Post article reported that some persons involved in peacemaking efforts in the southern Sudan region questioned the source and helpfulness of McFarlane's activities.  That article prompted FBI investigators to review McFarlane's activities in the Sudan. After an exhaustive probe that lasted three years and included search of his trash, email, and personal belongings, investigators concluded  their search and did not file any criminal charges.

In July 2011, McFarlane, in cooperation with former CIA director Jim Woolsey, co-founded the United States Energy Security Council, sponsored by the Institute for the Analysis of Global Security.

Death
McFarlane died on May 12, 2022, at a hospital in Lansing, Michigan, from complications of a lung condition at the age of 84. He lived in Washington, D.C., but was visiting family in Michigan at the time of his death. On July 27, 2022, the Congressional Record published, "Remembering the Honorable Robert C. "Bud" McFarlane," commemorating the respect he commanded around the world for his diverse leadership roles.

Awards and decorations

See also

 Iran–United States relations
 List of people pardoned or granted clemency by the president of the United States

Citations

General and cited references 
 "Complaint That Donald Regan May Be Placing Blame for the Iran Initiative on Robert McFarlane," Secret PROFS email (November 7, 1986).  Original source: US National Security Council.
 Kornbluh, Peter and Malcolm Byrne, eds. The Iran-Contra Affair: The Making of a Scandal, 1983–1988 (Document collection). Alexandria, VA: Chadwyck-Healey; Washington, D.C.: National Security Archive, 1990.
 Kornbluh, Peter and Malcolm Byrne, eds. The Iran-Contra Scandal: The Declassified History. New York: New Press, Distributed by W. W. Norton, 1993.
 Walsh, Lawrence E. Firewall: The Iran-Contra Conspiracy and Cover-up. New York: Norton, 1997.
 Timberg, Robert, The Nightingale's Song.  New York: Free Press, 1996.
 
 McFarlane, Robert C.; Smardz, Zofia (1994). Special Trust: Pride, Principle and Politics Inside the White House. New York: Cadell & Davies.

Further reading
  Tells the stories of John McCain, James Webb, Oliver North, Robert McFarlane, and John Poindexter; the impact of the Vietnam War.
  Discussion of Iran-Contra and McFarlane's role in the Reagan administration.

External links

 Official Web Site of the Partnership for a Secure America
  Official Web Site of the Committee on the Present Danger
  Institute of World Politics
 

|-

|-

1937 births
2022 deaths
Foreign Policy Research Institute
Graduate Institute of International and Development Studies alumni
Iran–Contra affair
Military personnel from Texas
Military personnel from Washington, D.C.
Reagan administration controversies
Recipients of American presidential pardons
Recipients of the Navy Distinguished Public Service Award
Recipients of the Navy Distinguished Service Medal
Texas Republicans
The Washington Institute for Near East Policy
United States Deputy National Security Advisors
United States Marine Corps officers
United States Marine Corps personnel of the Vietnam War
United States National Security Advisors
United States Naval Academy alumni
White House Fellows